Ripe is the third and final studio album by Pleasanton, California-based rock band Field Trip. It was released in April 1991 by Slash Records. In addition to the band's own lineup, Ripe also features keyboard playing by Faith No More's Roddy Bottum.

Critical reception

The Chicago Tribunes David Rothschild gave Ripe 2 and a half stars out of 4, writing that the album "...combines elements of metal, country and new wave with a local bar band sound. [Lead singer and guitarist] Jim Galbraith's catchy, twanging guitar hooks and gawky vocals help define the band's playful personality, occasionally bringing to mind the Young Fresh Fellows." Brent Ainsworth of the Santa Cruz Sentinel wrote that the album "...brings back memories of the Knack, who shocked the charts with "My Sharona" in 1979. You remember how harmless and upbeat the Knack was, don't you? This is harmless and upbeat – in other words, initially fun but a little boring in the long run."

Track listing
Let's Stay In	
Nothing Better To Do	
Ugly	
Please	
Come Along	
Hard To Say	
You Spin Me Round (Like A Record)
Sit On My Hands	
Another Lonely Day	
Wake Up Alone	
Second Cousin	
Ballad Of Field Trip

Personnel

Field Trip
Jim Galbraith - lead guitar
T.S. Galbraith - drums
Greg Kingle - bass
Steve Laborde - rhythm guitar

Guest musicians
Roddy Bottum - keyboards
Jim Fitting - harmonica

Technical personnel
Tony Dawsey - engineering
Paul Q. Kolderie - engineering, mixing, production
Carl Plaster - engineering
Sean Slade - engineering, mixing, production

References

1991 albums
Field Trip (band) albums
Slash Records albums
Albums produced by Paul Q. Kolderie
Albums produced by Sean Slade